Collecorvino is a comune and town in the Province of Pescara in the Abruzzo region of Italy.

References

External links 

 Comune di Collecorvino website
 Collecorvino Information website

Cities and towns in Abruzzo